This article lists the official squads for the 2021 Women's Rugby League World Cup which, postponed due to the COVID-19 pandemic is being held in November 2022.

Pool A

Brazil 
Head coach:  Paul Grundy 
Captains: Maria Graf, Giovanna Moura.
Summary: 3 matches, 3 losses. 5 tries by 4 try-scorers,  2 goals. 24 points scored. 
Players in the table ordered for their playing positions for the Round 3 match against Canada on 9 November.

Notes:
 The squad was announced on 10 October 2022.
 Two members of the squad played in the November 2018 match against Argentina, Tatiane Fernandes and Maria Graf.
 All players in the squad participated in the warm-up match against France on 27 October 2022, with Franciny Amaral scoring a try.

Canada 
Head coach:  Mike Castle 
Captain: Gabrielle Hindley 
Summary: 3 matches, 1 win, 2 losses. 7 tries by 5 try-scorers. 5 goals. 38 points scored. 
Players in the table ordered for their playing positions for the Round 3 match against Brazil on 9 November.

Notes:
 The Ravens' World Cup Squad was announced in early September.
 Tallies in the table include the 25 October 2022 match against Ireland.
 Support Staff for the tournament are
 Assistant Coaches: Ben Hickey, Stevi Schnoor, Darryl Fisher.
 Team Manager: Katie Grudzinski
 Laura Mariu played for New Zealand Kiwi Ferns from 2000 to 2018 including all five previous World Cups. Mariu qualifies to play for Canada through her mother. Kiwi Ferns records are incomplete for the period from 2002 to 2010, with full line-ups known for only 8 of 18 matches. Mariu's record from known appearances is at least 24 caps, with nine tries and 25 goals, including 10 goals in a match, against the Pacific Islands in the 2008 World Cup.

England 

Head coach:  Craig Richards 
Captain: Emily Rudge 
Summary: 4 matches, 3 wins, 1 loss. 34 tries by 14 try-scorers. 19 goals. 174 points scored. 
Players in the table ordered for their playing positions for the Semi-Final match against New Zealand on 14 November.

Notes:
 The England squad was announced on 26 September.
 Squad jumper numbers for the tournament were announced on 18 October 2022.

Papua New Guinea 
Head coach:  Ben Jeffries 
Captain: Elsie Albert 
Summary: 4 matches, 2 wins, 2 losses. 22 tries by 13 try-scorers. 10 goals by 2 goal-kickers. 108 points scored. 
Players in the table ordered for their playing positions for the Semi-Final match against Australia on 14 November.

Notes:
 A squad of 24 players participated in the World Cup.
 Jersey numbers were announced in late October.
 Other Matches include two trial matches against a Far North Queensland team (in 2017), the Brisbane Broncos (in 2018 and 2019), York Valkyrie (on 20 October 2022) and three 20-a-side Prime Minister's XIII matches against Australia (in 2017, 2018 and 2022).
 Elsie Albert has played 15 NRLW matches across three seasons (2020 to 2022), all for the St George Illawarra Dragons, scoring three tries. Her commitments with the Dragons prevented her participation in the recent PM XIII's match as it was held on the same day as an NRLW semi-final.
 Therese Aiton has played 2 NRLW matches in the 2021 season, both for the Parramatta Eels.
 Support Staff includes Meg Ward as an assistant coach.
 Elizabeth Kapa (PNG Southern Confederate) was selected in the squad but was ruled out due to an injury. Ua Ravu was brought into the squad.
 The Orchids announced via social media on 26 October that Tara Moxon had been added to the squad.

Pool B

Australia 
Head coach:  Brad Donald 
Captains: Kezie Apps, Sam Bremner, Ali Brigginshaw. Tallisha Harden. 
Summary: 5 matches, 5 wins. 58 tries by 16 try-scorers. 40 goals by 4 goal-kickers. 312 points scored. 
Table last updated 20 November 2022. Players' ages are as at that date. Players in the table ordered for their playing positions for the Final match against New Zealand on 19 November.

Notes:
 The squad was announced on 3 October 2022 (after the Grand Final of the 2022 NRLW season) and updated on 4 October following the withdrawal and replacement of two players.
 Original selections Millie Boyle (work commitments) and Tamika Upton (calf injury) withdrew on 4 October and were replaced by Shaylee Bent and Emma Tonegato.
 Jersey numbers were announced in late October.
 Taliah Fuimaono played her one international match for Samoa in 2019.
 Assistant coaches are Neil Henry, Jess Skinner and Kate Mullaly.

Cook Islands 
Head coach:  Rusty Matua 
Captains: Kimiora Breayley-Nati, Elianna Walton. 
Summary: 3 matches, 1 win, 2 losses. 12 tries by 9 try-scorers. 3 goals. 54 points scored. 
Players in the table ordered for their playing positions for the Round 3 match against France on 10 November.

Notes:
 The Cook Islands team was announced on 6 October 2022.
 Jersey numbers were announced in late October.
 Kimiora Breayley-Nati has played 6 Internationals for New Zealand from 2017 to 2018. She played Nines for New Zealand in 2017 and for the Cook Islands in 2018.
 Kiana Takairangi played 3 matches for the Cook Islands in the 2017 World Cup, and 2 matches for New Zealand in 2019. She played Nines for New Zealand in 2019.
 Elianna Walton played for Australia debuting in 2009, and participating in the 2013 and 2017 World Cups. In 2019, Walton played for Samoa.
 Chantay Kiria-Ratu, April Ngatupuna and Lavinia Kitai all played for Queensland Under 19's in June 2022.
 Mackenzie Wiki is the daughter of New Zealand Rugby League international Ruben Wiki.

France 
Head coach:  Vincent Baloup 
Captain: Alice Varela 
Summary: 3 matches, 3 losses. 4 tries by 3 try-scorers. 1 goal. 18 points scored. 
Players in the table ordered for their playing positions for the Round 3 match against Cook Islands on 10 November.

Notes:
 The squad was announced in September 2022.
 Jersey numbers were announced in late October.
 Tally of participating players and points known for France women's rugby league international matches from 2010 onwards. Consequently, the tally for Alice Varela (15 matches) does not include potential appearances in the 2008 World Cup (up to 5 matches) and matches against England, one in July 2008 and two in July 2009. Verela's profile notes her debut in 2008.
 Sarah Menaa was included in the initial squad but was replaced by Anaëlle Meunier.

New Zealand 
Head coach:  Ricky Henry 
Captain: Krystal Rota 
Summary: 5 matches, 3 wins, 2 losses. 23 tries by 14 try-scorers. 10 goals by 2 goal-kickers. 112 points scored. 
Table last updated 20 November 2022. Player's ages are as at that date. Players in the table ordered for their playing positions for the Final match against Australia on 19 November.

Notes
 The squad was announced on 3 October 2022.
 Jersey numbers were announced in late October.
 In last October, the New Zealand Rugby League announced that original selection Kararaina Wira-Kohu was withdrawn due to injury and had been replaced by Abigail Roache.
 Mele Hufanga played one match for Tonga in 2020.
 Crystal Tamarua played two matches for the Cook Islands in the 2017 World Cup.

References 

Women's Rugby League World Cup
Rugby League World Cup squads
World Cup
Australia